Sasunaga is a genus of moths of the family Noctuidae.

Species
 Sasunaga apiciplaga Warren, 1912
 Sasunaga interrupta Warren, 1912
 Sasunaga leucorina (Hampson, 1908)
 Sasunaga longiplaga Warren, 1912
 Sasunaga oenistis (Hampson, 1908)
 Sasunaga tenebrosa (Moore, 1867)
 Sasunaga tomaniiviensis Robinson, 1975

References
Natural History Museum Lepidoptera genus database
Sasunaga at funet

Hadeninae